Kafr Hum  is a Syrian village located in Harem Nahiyah in Harem District, Idlib.  According to the Syria Central Bureau of Statistics (CBS), Kafr Hum had a population of 1143 in the 2004 census.

References 

Populated places in Harem District